The Minds of 99 is a Danish post-punk band, formed in 2012. Since then they have released four albums.

Background
The band, consisting of five childhood friends, won DR's Karrierrekanonen in 2013. The first single, "Det er Knud som er død", from their debut album, is based on a poem by the Danish journalist and writer Tom Kristensen about the Danish scientist and national hero Knud Rasmussen. The song reached first place on Det Elektriske Barometer and became P3's Uundgåelige in February 2014.

Performance at Orange Stage
The Minds of 99 was the opening act at Roskilde Festival 2015. The concert was named as the best opener of the festival in years by numerous media outlets.

Discography

Albums 
 The Minds of 99 (2014)
 Liber (2015)
 Solkongen (2018)
 Infinity Action (2022)

Singles 
 "Det er Knud som er død" (2014)
 "Et barn af min tid" (2014)
 "Hurtige hænder" (2014)
 "Rav" (2014)
 "Stjerner På Himlen" (2015)
 "Ma Cherie Bon Bon" (2015)
 "Hjertet følger med" (2016)
 "I'm Gonna Die" (2017)
 "Alle skuffer over tid" (2018)
 1,2,3,4 (2019)
 Som Fluer (2019)
 Big City, Bright Lights (2020)
 En Stemme (2020)
 Under Din Sne (2021)

Awards
In relation to their critically acclaimed debut album from May 2014, the band received numerous awards. Among others, the band won at the 2015 Årets Steppeulv for Song of the Year ("Det er Knud som er død"), as well as at the 2015 Carl Prisen for both Talent of the Year and Best Rock Songwriters of the Year. The band garnered a number of nominations as well at both Danish Music Awards (Danish Group of the Year, Best New Danish Act, Best Rock Publication), GAFFA-prisen (Best New Danish Act, Best Rock Publication) and Zulu Awards (Best New Danish Act).

References 

Musical groups established in 2012
2012 establishments in Denmark